Nathaniel "Nate" Lewis (born October 19, 1966) is a former professional American football wide receiver in the National Football League. He played six seasons for the San Diego Chargers (1990–1993) and the Chicago Bears (1994–1995).

Born and raised in Moultrie, GA, Lewis attended Oregon Tech where he played one season his senior year.  Following his freshman year at a junior college: Oklahoma A&M, Lewis played at Georgia his sophomore and junior years, however he was dismissed due to academic reasons following his junior year.

His senior year at Oregon Tech was ended short due to a leg injury, but included 27 caught passes for 434 yards and two touchdowns.

References

1966 births
Living people
People from Moultrie, Georgia
Players of American football from Georgia (U.S. state)
American football wide receivers
American football return specialists
Oregon Tech Hustlin' Owls football players
Chicago Bears players
San Diego Chargers players